Citizen of Time is an album by David Arkenstone, released in 1990. The liner notes contain a short story about a character called The Citizen of Time. Each track relates to a part of his travels.

Track listing
"Top of the World" – 4:47
"The Great Wall" – 4:42
"Firestix" – 4:00
"Out of the Forest and Into the Trees" – 4:35
"The Malabar Caves" – 3:28
"Voices of the Anasazi" – 4:40
"The Northern Lights" – 4:26
"Rumours of Egypt" – 5:59
"Splendor of the Sun" – 4:00
"Explorers" – 7:48
 All tracks composed by David Arkenstone

Personnel
 David Arkenstone – keyboards, Korg M1, grand piano, guitar, bass, pennywhistle, flute
 Daniel Chase – percussion
 Tracy Strand – vocals

References

1990 albums
David Arkenstone albums
Narada Productions albums